Scodionyx is a genus of moths of the family Noctuidae.

Species
Scodionyx mysticus Staudinger, 1900

References
Natural History Museum Lepidoptera genus database

Catocalinae
Moth genera